The Catering functional constituency is a functional constituency in the elections for the Legislative Council of Hong Kong. It was created for the 2000 Legislative Council election to replace the Urban Council and Regional Council constituencies. The constituency is composed of bodies of several catering associations. It is also corresponding to the Catering Subsector in the Election Committee. Since its creation, it has been held by Liberal Party's Tommy Cheung.

A similar Hotels and Catering functional constituency was created for the 1995 election by the then governor Chris Patten with a much larger electorate base which composed of almost 70,000 voters.

Composition
Before the major electoral overhaul in 2021, the Catering constituency contained both corporate and individual members who held food licenses and/or are members of associations such as the Association for the Hong Kong Catering Services Management Limited, the Hong Kong Catering Industry Association Limited and the Association of Restaurant Managers Limited.

The constituency was criticised for favouring big business. It was revealed that around one in 10 corporate voters have links to four major conglomerates in Hong Kong, more than 100 of the 1,004 corporate voters registered give addresses connected with the Tao Heung Group, Cafe de Coral Group, Fulum Group and Victoria Harbour Restaurant Group.

After the electoral change in 2021, the eligible voters constituency were further limited to the bodies who are holders of food business licences under the Public Health and Municipal Services Ordinance that are entitled to vote at the Board of The Association for Hong Kong Catering Services Management Limited, the Association of Restaurant Managers Limited or the Hong Kong Catering Industry Association Limited. As a result, the registered voters declined sharply from 5,485 in 2016 to only 141 in 2021.

Return members

Electoral results

2020s

2010s

2000s

References

Constituencies of Hong Kong
Constituencies of Hong Kong Legislative Council
Functional constituencies (Hong Kong)
2000 establishments in Hong Kong
Constituencies established in 2000